Mistah may refer to:

 Mistah F.A.B. (born 1982), American rapper, record producer, entrepreneur and activist
 Mistah (film), a 1994 Filipino action film